Cecilie Højgaard Brandt (born 16 November 2001) is a Danish handball player who plays for  Herning-Ikast Håndbold in the Damehåndboldligaen and the Danish national team.

She also represented Denmark in the 2019 Women's U-19 European Handball Championship, placing 6th.

She made her debut on the Danish national team on 5 March 2022 against Romania, appearing for the team during the EHF Women's Euro 2022 qualifying cycle.

Achievements 
Damehåndboldligaen:
Bronze Medalist: 2021, 2022

References

2001 births
Living people
Danish female handball players
People from Viborg Municipality
Sportspeople from the Central Denmark Region